Charles James Ruthven Howard, 12th Earl of Carlisle, 12th Lord Ruthven of Freeland MC (21 February 1923 – 28 November 1994), styled Viscount Morpeth until 1963, was an English nobleman, politician, and peer.

Background and education
Lord Carlisle was the son of George Howard, 11th Earl of Carlisle and Bridget Monckton, 11th Lady Ruthven of Freeland. He was educated at Eton College. He succeeded his father in the earldom in 1963 and his mother in the lordship of Ruthven of Freeland in 1982.

Family
Lord Carlisle married the Honourable Ela Helen Aline  (1925-2002), daughter of Wentworth Beaumont, 2nd Viscount Allendale and Violet Lucy Emily Seely, daughter of Sir Charles Seely, 2nd Baronet, on 3 October 1945.  They had four children:
 Lady Jane Howard (b. 28 February 1947)
 George William Beaumont Howard, 13th Earl of Carlisle (b. 15 February 1949)
 Lady Emma Howard (b. 20 July 1952)
 Hon. Philip Charles Wentworth Howard (b. 25 March 1963)

References

External links

1923 births
1994 deaths
12
12
Charles
People educated at Eton College